Ministry of Peace may refer to:

One of the Ministries of Nineteen Eighty-Four, the dystopian novel of George Orwell
Ministry of Peace (Ethiopia), an Ethiopian government ministry overseeing intelligence services, police, immigration and the encouragement of peace processes

See also
 Department of Peace, a proposed cabinet-level department of the executive branch of the federal government of the United States